Ziaratgah (also Romanized as  Zīāratgāh and Zīyāratgāh; also known as Deh-e Zeyāratqāh and Deh-e Zīāratgāh) is a village in Takab Rural District, Shahdad District, Kerman County, Kerman Province, Iran. At the 2006 census, its population was 119, in 24 families.

References 

Populated places in Kerman County